The first W.A.K.O. Amateur European Championships were organized by George Bruckner and held in Vienna in 1977 and between 1977 and 1982 the organization held a European Championships each year.  W.A.K.O. began to change the timing of the championships after 1982, making sure that they were every two years, thus (generally) falling between world championships. In 1994 W.A.K.O. first started introduce two European championships to be held in the same year.

List of European Championships

WAKO European Championships (Seniors and Masters)

 https://web.archive.org/web/20160809232051/http://www.wakoweb.com/en/page/official-wako-results/feeb0c9a-67d8-4081-9bda-45384f8ee985

WAKO European Championships (Cadets and Juniors)

 2017 Results : https://www.sportdata.org/kickboxing/set-online/veranstaltung_info_main.php?active_menu=calendar&vernr=394

See also
List of WAKO Amateur World Championships
List of kickboxers

References

External links
 WAKO World Association of Kickboxing Organizations Official Site

WAKO Amateur European Championships events
Kickboxing-related lists
European championships